Cutting in line, also known as line/queue jumping, butting, barging, budging, bunking, skipping, breaking, ditching, shorting, pushing in, or cutsies, is the act of entering a queue or line at any position other than the end. The act is extremely stigmatized in most human cultures and stands in stark contrast to the normal policy of first come, first served that governs most queue areas.

Reaction
A negative and very assertive response from the rear of the line is expected when someone has cut in line up ahead under any circumstances in virtually all cultures. According to one study, a person cutting in line has a 54% chance that others in the line will object. With two people cutting in line, there is a 91.3% chance that someone will object. The proportion of people objecting from anywhere behind the cutter is 73.3%, with the person immediately behind the point of intrusion objecting most frequently.

Nevertheless, physical altercation resulting from cutting is rare. It was reported that an 18-year-old National Serviceman in Malaysia was bludgeoned to death after he attempted to jump the queue at a food counter. Another incident occurred in New York City at The Halal Guys food cart, resulting in the death of the man who cut in line. The man who killed him was found not guilty by reason of self-defense.

Legislators in the US state of Washington passed a bill that makes cutting in line to catch a ferry illegal. Cutters can be fined $101 and forced to return to the end of the line.

In 2022, Holly Willoughby and Philip Schofield drew criticism for not joining The Queue with the public, when filming for This Morning at the lying in state of Queen Elizabeth II in Westminster Hall. ITV said that they were escorted from the press gallery by government staff, and did not file past the Queen's coffin. Social media users contrasted this against the actions of other celebrities such as David Beckham and Susanna Reid, who queued for many hours with members of the general public.

Merging on roads

Cutting is present on roadways, especially restricted access highways, where traffic queues build up at merge locations. Drivers who bypass traffic by waiting until the last possible moment before merging are sometimes considered to be "cutters," and are frequent instigators of road rage. This behavior is not usually illegal in the US, unless the driver crosses a solid white line or uses dangerous merging techniques.

In contrast, using the merging lane until the last moment is required by law in Germany, Austria and Belgium, when two lanes merge into one and only if traffic speed is slowed down, as doing so reduces the length of backed up cars. Where construction zones close a lane, parts of Canada and the U.S. encourage the "zipper" method of merging, which was introduced in 2002 by the Minnesota Department of Transportation. The zipper method can reduce congestion up to 40%, while also giving drivers plenty of adjustment time for the merge and reducing the speed differential between the open lane and the lane with the upcoming closure.

Sanctioned line cutting

Amusement parks
In some instances cutting in line is sanctioned by the authority overseeing the queue. For example amusement park operators such as Cedar Fair (Fast Lane), Six Flags (Flash Pass), and Walt Disney (FastPass) have Virtual queue programs whereby a limited number of patrons cut the line for an attraction by arriving at a pre-designated time (sometimes, but not always, associated with a payment for the privilege). Common penalties for cutting the line without this privilege range from being forced to the back of the line to removal from the premises.

Airports
At airports, it is customary – for the sake of efficiency – to allow pregnant women, adults accompanying small children, the elderly and the physically disabled to board an airplane first, regardless of their seat, class or assignment. However, the priority afforded wheelchair-using passengers has reportedly given rise to a practice in the United States, whereby some passengers who do not normally use a wheelchair request one, to pass through security checks quickly and to be among the first to board an aircraft. At the conclusion of the flight, these passengers walk off the aircraft, instead of waiting for a wheelchair and thus being among the last to disembark. The neologism "miracle flight" has been coined to describe this behavior, as passengers apparently needing a wheelchair before boarding the aircraft are "miraculously" able to walk afterwards.

See also
 Cutting in, an act of taking a dance partner
Line stander

References

External links
 Mind Your Queues! – article on the Indian attitude towards queueing

Interpersonal conflict
Queue management